Gonzalo de Illescas may refer to:

Gonzalo de Illescas (bishop), died 1464
Gonzalo de Illescas (historian), died 1574?